Illuminations is a 1976 Australian film directed by Paul Cox. It was Cox's first full-length feature film although he had made numerous shorts beforehand.

Plot
A couple living together have a tense relationship. The woman's father dies and she becomes preoccupied with death. She almost drowns in the bath but then recovers her enthusiasm for life.

Cast
Gabriella Trsek as Gabi
Tony Llewellyn-Jones as Tony
Norman Kaye as Gabi's father
Sheila Florance
Athol Shmith
Tibor Markus
Robert Trauer
Elke Neidhardt
Fabian Muir
Alena Leiss
Christopher Stewart
Dora Stubenrauch
Ilona Enten
John Williams

Production
The film was inspired by a dream Paul Cox had in the early 1970s about being trapped in a coffin, seeing people who he had known all his life.

$16,000 of the budget came through the Film, Radio and Television Board of the Australia Council, with the rest from private investment. It was released through Melbourne Co-operatives but never recovered its cost.

References

External links

Illuminations at Oz Movies

1976 films
Australian drama films
Films directed by Paul Cox
1970s English-language films
1970s Australian films